Casares de Arbas or Casares de Arbás is a locality and minor local entity located in the municipality of Villamanín, in León province, Castile and León, Spain. As of 2020, it has a population of 54.

Geography 
Casares de Arbas is located 73km north-northwest of León, Spain.

References

Populated places in the Province of León